General elections were held in Lebanon in May and June 2005 to elect the 128 members of the Parliament of Lebanon. They were the second elections in thirty years without a Syrian military or intelligence presence in Lebanon. These elections were the first in Lebanese history to be won outright by a single electoral block and were also the first to be monitored by the United Nations.

Results

First round
The first round was held on May 29, 2005 in Beirut. The Rafik Hariri Martyr List, a coalition of Saad Hariri's Current for the Future, the Progressive Socialist Party and other anti-Syrian parties, won all 19 seats.  Saad Hariri is the son of former Lebanese Prime Minister Rafik Hariri who was assassinated in February 2005, in a car bombing in Beirut. The coalition left one seat free for a Shiite candidate from Hezbollah.

Second round
The second round was held on June 5 in South Lebanon and Nabatyeh Governorate. The Resistance and Development Bloc, a joint ticket by the  two main Shiite parties Amal and Hezbollah, in addition to Bahiya Al-Hariri, the sister of the assassinated late Prime Minister Rafic Al-Hariri and Oussama Saad from Sidon, won all 23 seats. Official tallies showed the Resistance and Development Bloc receiving more than 80% of the vote.

Third round
The third round was held on June 12 in Beqaa and Mount Lebanon. In Mount Lebanon the Hariri List won 17 seats, as did the Aoun Alliance, made up of Michel Aoun's Free Patriotic Movement and two smaller parties; Hezbollah won one. In Beqaa, the Resistance and Development Bloc won 11 seats, the Hariri List eight, and the Aoun Alliance four. Aoun re-stamped his authority as a major Christian leader on the political scene.

Fourth round
The fourth and final round was held on June 20 in North Governorate. The Hariri List won all 28 seats, giving them a total of 72 of the National Assembly's 128 seats.

Total

Turnout
Turnout was estimated around 46.5%.

See also
 List of Lebanese Members of Parliament
 2018 Lebanese general election

Notes

External links
Angus Reid Consultants - Election Tracker
Documentary photography project on Lebanon during the time leading up to the 2005 elections by Austrian Photojournalist Stephan Rauch

Elections in Lebanon
Lebanon
2005 in Lebanon
Election and referendum articles with incomplete results